Yuttha Medai All Stars is a Tamil language reality dance show from Malaysia. This show was aired in Astro Vinmeen HD.

Episodes

References

Malaysian reality television series
Tamil-language television shows
2016 Malaysian television series debuts
2017 Malaysian television series endings